The declension of nouns in Latin that are borrowed from Greek varies significantly between different types of nouns, though certain patterns are common. Many nouns, particularly proper names, in particular, are fully Latinized and declined regularly according to their stem-characteristics. Others, however, either retain their Greek forms exclusively, or have the Greek and Latin forms side by side. These variations occur principally in the singular; in the plural the declension is usually regular. Note, however, that many Greek names of the third declension in Latin pass over into the first declension in the Plural; as, Thūcȳdidās, Hyperīdae, and many names in -crates (such as, Sōcratae as well as Sōcratēs).

In the vocative singular, names in -is, -ys, -ēs, -eus and -ās (Gen., -antis) form the vocative by dropping the -s from the nominative.

In the accusative singular, many proper and some common nouns, imparisyllabic, often take the Greek -a for -em. Names in -ēs, is and ys take -ēn, -in and -yn as well as -ēm, -im and ym.

A few Greek nouns in -os, mostly geographical, belong to the second declension, and sometimes make Accusative in -on as Dēlos, Acc. Dēlon (but Dēlum in prose).

In the genitive singular, names in -ēs, parisyllabic, take -ī as well as -is. Some feminine nouns in -ô have the genitive in -ūs.

Greek names ending in -eus are declined both according to the Greek and according to the Latin second declension (but the genitive -eī and the dative -eō are often pronounced as one syllable in poets).

In the nominative plural, imparisyllabic Nouns often take -es instead of -ēs and, in the accusative plural, the same nouns often take -ā instead of -ēs.

In the genitive plural, -ōn and -eōn are found in the titles of books; as, Geōrgicōn and Metamorphōseōn.

Greek neuter nouns in -ma (Gen., -matis) always make their dative and ablative plurals in -īs instead of -ibus.

First declension 
Proper names ending in -ē (fem.) and -ās (masc.), and many in -ēs (masc.), especially patronymics in -dēs, belong to the First declension. So a few common nouns, as sōphistēs "sophist". Many Greek names in -ē have two forms, one Greek and one Latin: as Atalantē, -ēs, or Atalanta, -ae.

Declension of proper names

Declension of nouns

Second declension

Declension of proper names

Declension of nouns

Third declension

Declension of proper names

Declension of nouns

Fourth declension

Declension of nouns

Mixed declension

Declension of proper names

References

Ancient Greek declension
Latin declension